Krusa is a genus of harvestmen in the family Sclerosomatidae from Mexico.

Species
 Krusa amazonica Roewer, 1953
 Krusa annulata C.J.Goodnight & M.L.Goodnight, 1945
 Krusa boliviana Roewer, 1953
 Krusa flava C.J.Goodnight & M.L.Goodnight, 1946
 Krusa metallica C.J.Goodnight & M.L.Goodnight, 1946
 Krusa mexicana C.J.Goodnight & M.L.Goodnight, 1947
 Krusa peruviana Roewer, 1953
 Krusa pilipes (Roewer, 1953)
 Krusa stellata C.J.Goodnight & M.L.Goodnight, 1946
 Krusa tuberculata C.J.Goodnight & M.L.Goodnight, 1946

References

Harvestman genera